Charles Williams (born September 14, 1953) is a former Canadian football defensive back in the Canadian Football League who played for the Winnipeg Blue Bombers. He played college football for the Jackson State Tigers. He also played in the National Football League for the Philadelphia Eagles.

References

1953 births
Living people
American football defensive backs
Canadian football defensive backs
Winnipeg Blue Bombers players
Philadelphia Eagles players
Jackson State Tigers football players